Jolin Chien (born April 4, 1986) is a Taiwanese singer, actor and model. Formerly went by Samuel Chien, He was discovered while competing in a singing competition. He is a former member of the boy duo band StyLe and current co-leader of boy band . He and his group members were signed under Avex for music management and currently under Y.H Ent for acting and commercial management.

Biography
Chien was born on April 4, 1986 in Taoyuan, Taiwan. He is the youngest of a two-child family with a brother older than him by two years. Not much is mentioned about his father, all is known is that he grew up in a single parent household mainly raised by his mother. Chien said during his teenage years he was very rebellious and radical.

Career

Pre-debut
During his late teens, Chien entered a lot of local singing competition and was eventually discovered at a contest. In 2005 he signed with Universal Taiwan to form the musical dual StyLe with Lawrence Chen (陳浩偉). He went by the name Samuel during his time with StyLe. The group performed live throughout school campuses in Taiwan before releasing their self titled debut album in 2007. After finding little success with the group Chien decided to serve his mandatory military conscription and the group officially broke up in 2008 after he competed his military term.

After that Chien went on to work odd jobs such as bartending and cafe barista while trying to break back into the entertainment industry. While working at a cafe called Homey’s in Taipei he met Yorke Sun who went on to become one of 4ever's members.

Music
In 2011, Chien signed with Avex Taiwan to form four member boy band 4ever. The group debuted in 2012 and slowly found recognition when member David Hsu debuted in acting by starring in a supporting role in the critically acclaimed and award winning Taiwanese idol drama In Time with You. They released their first EP that same year, but however Avex Taiwan terminated their Taiwanese music division in 2013 and the group was left without a record label. Currently the group is not signed to any record label, but is still active as 4ever and continues to perform together.

Acting
Chien made his acting debut in TTV 2013 romance drama The Pursuit of Happiness in a minor supporting role as the eccentric office homosexual Simon. His acting was well received and the following year he landed the role of second male lead in 2014 SETTV romance comedy Pleasantly Surprised playing all around nice guy Cheng Hao Wei who is loyally devoted to his love interest since college. The drama also stars his bandmates Yorke Sun and Deyn Li in supporting roles. With the success of Pleasantly Surprised, Chien gained further recognition and SETTV once again offered him the second male lead role in 2015 romance comedy Murphy's Law of Love playing ideal perfect guy Xiang Zi Yan.

Personal life
Chien has a huge tribal tattoo on his right shoulder that can be seen when he wears a tank top. His hobbies include drawing, cooking, and singing.

Television series

Discography
with StyLe

with 4ever

Music video appearances

References

External links
 4ever Avex page
 
 

1986 births
Living people
Male actors from Taipei
Taiwanese male film actors
Taiwanese male television actors